Antoine Boudet was a French equestrian. He competed in the individual dressage event at the 1920 Summer Olympics.

References

Year of birth missing
Year of death missing
French male equestrians
Olympic equestrians of France
Equestrians at the 1920 Summer Olympics
Place of birth missing